River Patrol is a 1948 British crime film directed by Ben R. Hart and starring John Blythe, Lorna Dean, and Wally Patch. The screenplay concerns a group of undercover British customs officer who investigate a gang of nylon smugglers. It was made by Hammer Film Productions as a supporting feature. It was made at Marylebone Studios in London. It is notable for being one of the earliest films made by Hammer following its relaunch after the Second World War.

Plot summary

Two British police officers, Robby and Jean, go undercover, pretending to be husband and wife in order to smash a ring of smugglers along the Thames. During the investigation they visit the most shady places of London, including a night club with the worst imaginable reputation in the city. The fake spouses befriend and dupe the night club owner and find evidence leading to the top of the smuggler ring. However, their identities are revealed by the criminals before they can report back to their superiors, and they have to fight alone against the thugs until they finally manage to get them all arrested.

Cast
 John Blythe as Robby
 Lorna Dean as Jean
 Wally Patch as The Guy
 Stan Paskin
 Cyril Collins
 George Crowther
 Andrew Sterne
 Wilton West
 Tony Merrett
 George Kane 
 Johnny Doherty
 Iris Keen
 Dolly Gwynne

References

Bibliography
 Meikle, Denis. A History of Horrors: The Rise and Fall of the House of Hammer. Scarecrow Press, 2010.
 Chibnall, Steve & McFarlane, Brian. The British 'B' Film. Palgrave MacMillan, 2009.

External links

1948 films
1948 crime films
British crime films
Seafaring films
Films set in England
Hammer Film Productions films
Films shot at Marylebone Studios
British black-and-white films
1940s English-language films
1940s British films